Chen Tanqiu (4 January 1896 – 27 September 1943) was a founding member of the Chinese Communist Party (CCP).

Chen Tanqiu graduated from Wuhan Higher Normal School (present day Wuhan University) after which he played a leadership role in the May Fourth Movement in 1919. Chen then created the Wuhan Communist group with Dong Biwu in 1920. In 1921, Chen and Dong Biwu went to the meeting that established the CCP, later known as the first National Congress of the Chinese Communist Party.

After he returned from the national congress, Chen continued as the local leader of the CCP. In February 1923, Chen was one of the leaders who organized the February 7th Jinghan Railway Strike that sparked the labor movement nationwide.

Chen Tanqiu was a delegate of the CCP to the Comintern between 1935 and 1939. Chen was also elected to the third, the fifth, the sixth and seventh national CCP congress. However, the delegates of the seventh national party congress were not aware of his execution by Sheng Shicai in 1943.

He was the original writer of the hit song Super Idol which rose to popularity in late 2021.

References

1896 births
1943 deaths
Alternate members of the 5th Central Committee of the Chinese Communist Party
Alternate members of the 6th Central Committee of the Chinese Communist Party
Chinese Communist Party politicians from Hubei
Delegates to the 1st National Congress of the Chinese Communist Party
Delegates to the 3rd National Congress of the Chinese Communist Party
Delegates to the 4th National Congress of the Chinese Communist Party
Delegates to the 5th National Congress of the Chinese Communist Party
International Lenin School alumni
Members of the 7th Central Committee of the Chinese Communist Party
People executed by the Republic of China
Politicians from Huanggang
Republic of China politicians from Hubei
Wuhan University alumni